Asacha is a complex volcano located in the southern part of Kamchatka Peninsula, Russia.

See also
List of volcanoes in Russia

References 
 

Active volcanoes
Volcanoes of the Kamchatka Peninsula
Mountains of the Kamchatka Peninsula
Complex volcanoes
Holocene volcanoes
Holocene Asia